Acústico is the 18th album and second live album of Puerto Rican singer Ednita Nazario. Is the first of two albums recorded during a special presentation of her at the Luis A. Ferré Performing Arts Center in San Juan, Puerto Rico.

The album is the realization of a unique project of Nazario where she turned the Arts Center into a recording studio, inviting 300 friends to share with her that night.

The album includes special appearances by Puerto Rican singer/producer Tommy Torres, who would become Ednita's producer for her next few albums, and singer Jorge Laboy.

The album was certified platinum by the RIAA.

Track listing
 "Eres Libre"
 "Tú Sin Mí"
 "Tu Sabes Bien"
 "Ahora Es Tarde Ya"
 "Hielo Bajo El Sol" (with Tommy Torres)
 "Medley"
"El Dolor De Tu Presencia"
"Un Corazón Hecho Pedazos"
 "Lloviendo Flores"
 "Mas Grande Que Grande"
 "Medley"
"Por Ti Me Casaré"
"Mi Pequeño Amor" (with Jorge Laboy)
 "No Voy A Llorar"
 "Tanto Que Te Dí"
 "No Me Mires Así"

Awards

Billboard Latin Music Awards

Latin Grammy Awards

Personnel
 Produced by Ednita Nazario

Certifications

References

Ednita Nazario live albums
2002 live albums
2002 video albums
Live video albums
Spanish-language live albums